The following is a list of episodes for The WB sitcom Unhappily Ever After. The series premiered on January 11, 1995, and aired a total of 100 episodes during its five season run. The series' final episode aired on May 23, 1999.

Series overview

Episodes

Season 1 (1995)

Season 2 (1995–96)

Season 3 (1996–97)

Season 4 (1997–98)

Season 5 (1998–99)

References

External links
 

Unhappily Ever After